The Vernon Township School District is a comprehensive community public school district, that serves students in pre-kindergarten through twelfth grade from Vernon Township, in Sussex County, New Jersey, United States.

As of the 2018–19 school year, the district, comprised of six schools, had an enrollment of 3,012 students and 296.2 classroom teachers (on an FTE basis), for a student–teacher ratio of 10.2:1.

The district is classified by the New Jersey Department of Education as being in District Factor Group "FG", the fourth-highest of eight groupings. District Factor Groups organize districts statewide to allow comparison by common socioeconomic characteristics of the local districts. From lowest socioeconomic status to highest, the categories are A, B, CD, DE, FG, GH, I and J.

Awards and recognition
Peggy Stewart, a teacher at Vernon Township High School, was named New Jersey Teacher of the Year for 2004-2005.

Schools
Schools in the district (with 2018–19 enrollment data from the National Center for Education Statistics) are:
Elementary schools
Walnut Ridge School with 96 students in Pre-K
Cedar Mountain Primary School with 374 students in grades K-1
Rolling Hills Elementary School with 429 students in grades 2-3
Lounsberry Hollow School with 410 students in grades 4-5
Middle school
Glen Meadow Middle School with 680 students in grades 6-8
High school
Vernon Township High School with 995 students in grades 9-12

Administration
Core members of the district's administration are:
 Karen D’Avino, Superintendent of Schools
 Patricia Ratcliffe-Lee, Business Administrator / Board Secretary

Board of education
The district's board of education, comprised of nine members, sets policy and oversees the fiscal and educational operation of the district through its administration. As a Type II school district, the board's trustees are elected directly by voters to serve three-year terms of office on a staggered basis, with three seats up for election each year held (since 2012) as part of the November general election. The board appoints a superintendent to oversee the district's day-to-day operations and a business administrator to supervise the business functions of the district.

References

External links
Vernon Township School District

School Data for the Vernon Township School District, National Center for Education Statistics

New Jersey District Factor Group FG
School districts in Sussex County, New Jersey
Vernon Township, New Jersey